La Chinoise, ou plutôt à la Chinoise: un film en train de se faire (English: The Chinese, or, rather, in the Chinese manner: a film in the making), commonly referred to simply as La Chinoise, is a 1967 French political film directed by Jean-Luc Godard about a group of young Maoist activists in Paris.

La Chinoise is a loose adaptation of Fyodor Dostoyevsky's 1872 novel Demons. In the novel, a group of five disaffected citizens, each representing a different ideological persuasion and personality type, conspire to overthrow the Russian imperial regime through a campaign of sustained revolutionary violence. The film, set in contemporary Paris and largely taking place in a small apartment, is structured as a series of personal and ideological dialogues dramatizing the interactions of five French university students—three young men and two young women—belonging to a radical Maoist group called the "Aden Arabie Cell" (named after the novel Aden, Arabie by Paul Nizan). The film won the Grand Jury Prize in 1967 Venice Film Festival.

Plot
The five members are Véronique (Anne Wiazemsky), Guillaume (Jean-Pierre Léaud), Yvonne (Juliet Berto), Henri (Michel Semeniako) and Kirilov (Lex de Bruijn). A black student named Omar (Omar Blondin Diop), "Comrade X", also makes a brief appearance. The two main characters, Véronique and Guillaume Meister (the latter named after the titular hero of Goethe's famous 1795 bildungsroman Wilhelm Meister's Apprenticeship), discuss the issue of revolutionary violence and the necessity of political assassination to achieve revolutionary goals. As an advocate of terrorism as a means of bringing about the revolution, Véronique roughly corresponds to the character of Pyotr Stepanovich Verkhovensky in The Possessed. Véronique and Guillaume are engaged in a personal relationship, with Véronique as the more committed, dominant partner.

Yvonne is a girl from the country who occasionally works as a prostitute for extra money to purchase consumer goods (much like Juliette Janson, the principal character in Godard's previous film, Two or Three Things I Know About Her).  Yvonne does most of the housecleaning in the apartment and, together with Guillaume, she acts out satirical political skits protesting American imperialism in general, and U.S. President Lyndon Johnson's Vietnam policy in particular.

Henri is eventually expelled from the group for his apparent backsliding Soviet revisionism, comically suggested by his defense of the 1954 Nicholas Ray movie Johnny Guitar. In this sense he loosely corresponds to the character of Ivan Shatov in The Possessed, a student who is marked for assassination because he has abandoned the tenets of leftist radicalism.

Kirilov is the only character in the film who actually takes his name from a character in Dostoyevsky's novel; in The Possessed, Kirillov is a suicidal Russian engineer who has been driven to nihilism and insanity by the failure of his philosophical quest. True to his literary namesake, Godard's Kirilov also descends into madness and ultimately commits suicide.

When Guillaume complains that he cannot listen to music and work at the same time, Véronique uses a facetious declaration of "unlove" to teach him (and the audience) the Maoist lesson of "struggle on two fronts". Véronique then leaves the apartment alone and sets off for a mission to kill the Minister of Culture of the Soviet Union, Mikhail Sholokhov, during his official diplomatic visit to France.

On the train ride en route to the planned assassination, Véronique engages in a discussion with the political philosopher, Francis Jeanson (Jeanson was actually Anne Wiazemsky's philosophy professor at the Paris X University Nanterre during 1966–67; a few years earlier, he had once been a communist and the head of a network which supported the Algerian national liberation movement. This led to his highly publicized arrest and trial by the French government in September 1960.)

In the scene on the train, Jeanson argues against the use of violence as a means to shut down the French universities.  However this does not dissuade Véronique (for her dialogue in this scene, Godard fed Anne Wiazemsky her lines through an earpiece). The appearance of Francis Jeanson in the film seems to correspond to the character of Stepan Trofimovich Verkhovensky (Pyotr's father and Stavrogin's surrogate father) in The Possessed. Indeed, much like Stepan Trofimovich, Jeanson is an intellectual and philosopher who serves as a kind of father-figure/mentor to Véronique — and his early example as a supporter of terrorism makes him responsible for influencing much of the destruction which is to follow.

Eventually the train arrives at its destination, and Véronique sets off to the hotel where the Soviet Minister of Culture is staying. She at first mistakenly reverses the digits of the room number and ends up killing the wrong man, then returns and carries out the assassination upon realizing her mistake. The return of the original owners of the apartment where the cell has been living causes them to leave. The revolutionary activities of the Aden Arabie cell prove unsuccessful, and the film ends with Véronique narrating that she plans to return to school, having realized that she has made only the "first timid step in a long march".

Cast 

 Anne Wiazemsky as Véronique
 Jean-Pierre Léaud as Guillaume
  as Henri
 Juliet Berto as Yvonne
 Lex De Bruijn as Kirilov
 Omar Blondin Diop as Omar
 Francis Jeanson as himself
 Jean-Claude Sussfeld as driver

Themes
Thematically, La Chinoise concerns the 1960s New Left political interest in such historical and ongoing events as the legacy of Lenin's October 1917 Russian Revolution, the escalating U.S. military activities in the increasingly unstable region of southeast Asia, and especially the Cultural Revolution brought about by the Red Guards under Mao Zedong in the People's Republic of China. The film also touches upon the rise of anti-humanist poststructuralism in French intellectual life by the mid-1960s, particularly the anti-empiricist ideas of the French Marxist, Louis Althusser.

Godard likewise portrays the role that certain objects and organizations — such as Mao's Little Red Book, the French Communist Party, and other small leftist factions — play in the developing ideology and activities of the Aden Arabie cell. These objects and organizations appear to become repurposed as entertainment products and fashion statements within a modern consumer-capitalist society — the very society which the student radicals hope to transform through their revolutionary project.

This paradox is illustrated in the various joke sunglasses that Guillaume wears (with the national flags of the USA, USSR, China, France and Britain each filling the frames) while reading Mao's Little Red Book, as well as the sight gag of having dozens of copies of the Little Red Book piled in mounds on the floor to literally create a defensive parapet against the forces of capitalist imperialism, and a jaunty satirical pop song, "Mao-Mao" (sung by Claude Channes), heard on the soundtrack. Godard suggests that the students are, at the same moment, both serious committed revolutionaries intent on bringing about major social change and confused bourgeois youth flirting with the notion of radical politics as a fashionable and exciting distraction.

Reception
La Chinoise is not one of Godard's most widely seen films, and until 2008 was unavailable on DVD in North America. However a number of critics such as Pauline Kael, Andrew Sarris and Renata Adler have hailed it as among his best. Given that the film was made in March 1967 — one year before violent student protest became a manifest social reality in France — La Chinoise is now regarded as an uncannily prescient and insightful examination of the New Left activism during those years.

Along with Pierrot le fou, Masculin, féminin, Two or Three Things I Know About Her and Week End, La Chinoise is often seen as signaling a decisive step towards Godard's eventual renunciation of "bourgeois" narrative filmmaking. By 1968 he had switched to an overtly-political phase of revolutionary Maoist-collectivist didactic films with Jean-Pierre Gorin and the Dziga Vertov Group, which lasted for the next six years until 1973.

References

External links 
 
Jean-Luc Godard et La Chinoise- an Essay
MIM (maoist) review.
Filmaster, La Chinoise
  La Chinoise '98 Video 48']. Anne Wiazemsky has a dialog with A. Bergala, A. de Baecque, spectators of  MK2 Beaubourg (Paris) after the  projection of La Chinoise (1998.5.10)
Doug Enaa Greene and Shalon van Tine,   A Fight on Two Fronts: On Jean-Luc Godard's La Chinoise

1967 films
1960s avant-garde and experimental films
1960s French-language films
1960s political films
Films about communism
Films based on Russian novels
Films based on works by Fyodor Dostoyevsky
Films directed by Jean-Luc Godard
French avant-garde and experimental films
French political films
Venice Grand Jury Prize winners
1960s French films